Kathryn Joseph (born Kathryn Emma Sawers) is a Scottish singer-songwriter and musician. Her debut album Bones You Have Thrown Me and Blood I've Spilled won the 2015 Scottish Album of the Year Award.

Joseph, along with director, actor and musician Cora Bissett, wrote the music for a stage version of Emma Donoghue's book Room, which was produced by Theatre Royal Stratford East and Dublin's Abbey Theatre, in association with National Theatre of Scotland and Covent Garden Productions.

In 2017, Joseph collaborated with Marcus Mackay and The Twilight Sad's James Graham on the project Out Lines. Their debut album Conflats (2017, Rock Action Records) was released in October 2017. In June 2018, she appeared on the BBC Radio 4 programme "Loose Ends", and in August 2018 released her second album From When I Wake the Want Is. This album, like her debut, was shortlisted for the Scottish Album of the Year Award, but this time did not win the main prize.

In 2018, her versions of "Land O the Leal" and "Scots Wha Hae" were included in the film Outlaw King.

In 2022 Joseph released her third album, For You Who Are the Wronged, to critical acclaim.

Discography
Bones You Have Thrown Me and Blood I've Spilled (2016, Hits the Fan Records Records)
From When I Wake the Want Is (2018, Rock Action Records)
For You Who Are the Wronged (2022, Rock Action Records)

References

21st-century Scottish women singers
Scottish singer-songwriters
1974 births
Living people
Rock Action Records artists